The AFF U-23 Championship is an international football competition contested by the national under-23 teams of the member nations of the ASEAN Football Federation (AFF). The inaugural edition was held in 2005.

Background 
In 2005, the first edition was held in Bangkok, Thailand as the AFF U-23 Youth Championship. A second edition of the tournament was set to take place in Palembang, Indonesia between 16 and 26 July 2011 but was cancelled due to the main stadium of Gelora Sriwijaya Stadium, which was to be used for the tournament, still being under renovation. In 2019, the tournament was then revived as the AFF U-22 Youth Championship with Phnom Penh, Cambodia as the host where it also served as a preparatory tournament for the Southeast Asian Games and AFC U-23 Asian Cup football tournament.

Summary

Performance by country

Participating nations 

Legend

  — Champions
  — Runners-up
  — Third place
  — Fourth place

 GS — Group stage
 q — Qualified for the current tournament
  — Did not enter / Withdrew / Banned
  — Hosts

All-time ranking table

Awards

Winning coaches

Notes

See also 
 Football at the Southeast Asian Games
 AFC U-23 Asian Cup

References

External link 
 

 
AFF competitions
Under-23 association football